The men's C-1 1000 metres event was an open-style, individual canoeing event conducted as part of the Canoeing at the 1960 Summer Olympics program on Lake Albano.

Competition format

The competition was held over four rounds: heats, repechages, semifinals, and a final. Nobody was eliminated in the heats; the top three canoeists in each of the two heats advanced to the semifinals while all others who competed moved to the repechages. With only 13 competitors entering, this put seven canoeists in the repechages. There were two repechage heats, with the top three in each heat advancing to the semifinals—and only one canoeist eliminated. The semifinals consisted of three heats of four boats each, with the top three in each advancing to the final and only the fourth-place finisher eliminated. Thus, the first three rounds of competition narrowed the field only from 13 to nine boats.

Results

Heats

Fifteen competitors were entered, but only 13 competed on August 26. The top three finishers in both heats advanced in the semifinals while the others went to the repechages.

Heat 1

Heat 2

Repechages

Competed on August 26, the top three finishers in each of the two heats move to the semifinals.

Repechage 1

Repechage 2

Semifinals

Twelve canoers competed in the semifinals on August 27. The top three finishers in each semifinal advanced to the final.

Semifinal 1

Semifinal 2

Semifinal 3

Final

The final took place on August 29. Parti won using a canoe of his own design.

References
1960 Summer Olympics official report Volume 2, Part 1. pp. 254–6.
Sports-reference.com 1960 C-1 1000 m results.
Wallechinsky, David and Jaime Loucky (2008). "Canoeing: Men's Canadian Singles 1000 Meters". In The complete Book of the Olympics: 2008 Edition. London: Aurum Press Limited. p. 480.

Men's C-1 1000
Men's events at the 1960 Summer Olympics